Melissa Downes (born 17 September 1973) is an Australian broadcast journalist.

Downes is currently a co-presenter of Nine News Queensland alongside Andrew Lofthouse.

Career 
Downes first worked with Seven Brisbane where she was a reporter, fill-in presenter and also co-hosted a live 5pm local magazine show.

After joining Nine Brisbane in 2001, Downes reported on the road and acted as fill-in weekend presenter before assuming that role full-time in 2006. She has also worked as a reporter for local magazine show Saturday Extra and a presenter of QTQ-9's Nine Gold Coast News bulletin.

In November 2008, Downes replaced Heather Foord as presenter of Nine News Queensland weeknight bulletin alongside Bruce Paige (and later Andrew Lofthouse from June 2009 onwards).  Her appointment came at a time in which the bulletin had lost its long-standing ratings lead in the Brisbane market, Nine News Queensland having finished second behind the rival Seven News Brisbane for the second year in a row, as well as losing all 40 ratings weeks in 2008. However, in recent years Nine News Queensland has regained the lead locally, winning 21 out of 40 weeks in 2013.

Personal life

Early life 
Born and raised in Brisbane, Downes graduated from Somerville House in 1988. She moved to Sydney to model for two years before returning to Brisbane to complete an Arts Journalism degree at the University of Queensland.

Family 
Downes is married to DJ Wendt, owner of music group The Ten Tenors. The couple have two daughters.

References

External links
9 News
Twitter - Melissa Downes

Nine News presenters
Living people
1971 births
University of Queensland alumni
Australian women television journalists